Gheorghe "Gigi" Staicu (18 December 1935 – 10 June 2021) was a Romanian professional football player and manager who played for Steaua București, having developed in the club's academy. After retirement, Staicu started his manager career and was the manager of many Divizia A clubs, among them: Olimpia Satu Mare, Bihor Oradea, Universitatea Cluj or UM Timișoara. Staicu was also the assistant coach of the Romania national team, in the spell of Ștefan Kovacs and was for years the manager of the Olympic team.

Late years and death
In 2007, Staicu retired from football and since 2012 he was hospitalized in an asylum for the elderly, suffering from Alzheimer's disease. He died on 10 June 2021, at the age of 85.

Honours

Player
Steaua București
 Divizia A: 1959–60, 1960–61
 Cupa României: 1961–62

Manager
Olimpia Satu Mare
 Divizia B: 1973–74, 1976–77
 Cupa României: runner-up 1977–78

Bihor Oradea
 Divizia B: 1974–75, 1981–82

References

External links
 Gheorghe Staicu at labtof.ro

1935 births
2021 deaths
Footballers from Bucharest
Romanian footballers
Association football defenders
Liga I players
FC Steaua București players
Romanian football managers
FC Olimpia Satu Mare managers
FC Bihor Oradea managers
Romania national football team managers
FC Universitatea Cluj managers
FC Brașov (1936) managers
CSM Jiul Petroșani managers
CS Minaur Baia Mare (football) managers
Deaths from Alzheimer's disease